Šintava is a village and municipality in Galanta District of  the Trnava Region of south-west Slovakia.

History
 
In historical records the village is first mentioned in 1042, when King Peter, the successor of Stephen I of Hungary, having been deposed from his throne united with German emperor Henry III to gain back his country. They launched campaign against King Samuel Aba who, in 1041, had been elected king by the aristocrats who had toppled King Peter. Peter and Henry conquered Pozsony (now: Bratislava) and the whole area of the river Vah, castles Šintava, Galgóc (now: Hlohovec), Bana and they reached up to river Hron.

A second written historical report comes from Vienna picture chronicle in 1074, mentioning Šintava castle as the place where overthrown King Salomon of Hungary, son of King Andrew, was given assistance by Emperor Henry IV of Germany. They fought for Salomon to regain his throne, which had been occupied by King Géza, who had his residence in Nitra. The chronicle shows: "And when the emperor came to the river Vah, Solomon rode on horseback with three formations from Šintava towards Nitra". The settlement had Hungarian majority in the 17th century according to the Turkish tax census.

Geography
The municipality lies at an elevation of 139 metres and covers an area of 11.565 km². It has a population of about 1719 people.

External links
 
 Official page
 http://www.statistics.sk/mosmis/eng/run.html

Villages and municipalities in Galanta District